George Proctor may refer to:

 George O. Proctor (1847–1925), American politician in Massachusetts
 George R. Proctor (1920–2015), American botanist
 George Wyatt Proctor (1946–2008), American author, journalist, and lecturer

See also 
 Proctor (surname)